Cheburashka is a 1971 Soviet animated film directed by Roman Kachanov.

Plot summary 

Cheburashka wishes Gena the Crocodile a happy birthday and gives him a toy helicopter as a gift. After meeting some pioneers, they decide to be pioneers themselves. They build a playground for the local children and collect scrap metal, after which they become pioneers.

Creators
Director: Roman Kachanov
Scriptwriters: Eduard Uspensky, Roman Kachanov
Artist: Leonid Shvartsman
Operator: Theodor Bunimovich, Vladimir Sidorov
Composer: Vladimir Shainsky
Sound technician: Georgy Martynyuk
Animators: Yuri Norstein, Maya Buzinova, Natalya Dabizha

Cast
Klara Rumyanova as Cheburashka
Vasily Livanov as Gena the Crocodile
Vladimir Ferapontov as Gena (singing voice)
Tamara Dmitrieva as Pioneers

Soundtrack
This film opens with a song called "Let Them Run Clumsily" (Пусть бегут неуклюже) of Vladimir Shainsky on Alexander Timofeevsky's words.

References

External links
 Cheburashka on Russian Film Hub
Cheburashka at Animator.ru

1971 films
Animated films based on children's books
Films based on works by Eduard Uspensky
Soviet animated films
1970s stop-motion animated films
1970s Russian-language films
Soyuzmultfilm